Obulapuram is a village in Anantapur district, Andhra Pradesh, India. It has one iron ore mine.

References 

Villages in Anantapur district